Lia Orlandini (January 12, 1896 – April 9, 1975) was an Italian film actress. She was also a voice actor, dubbing foreign films for release in Italy.

Selected filmography
 Quo Vadis (1913)
 Julius Caesar (1914)
 Unjustified Absence (1939)
 The Night of Tricks (1939)
 Backstage (1939)
 Then We'll Get a Divorce (1940)
 Abandonment (1940)
 Headlights in the Fog (1942)
 Two Hearts Among the Beasts (1943)
 Anything for a Song (1943)
 Deceit (1952)
 Letter from Naples (1954)

References

Bibliography
 Piero Pruzzo & Enrico Lancia. Amedeo Nazzari. Gremese Editore, 1983.

External links

1896 births
1975 deaths
Italian film actresses
Italian silent film actresses
20th-century Italian actresses
Actresses from Milan